MUTV (Manchester United Television) is a premium television channel owned and operated by English football club Manchester United. The channel first broadcast on 10 September 1998.

MUTV offers Manchester United fans exclusive interviews with players and staff, full matches, including all Premier League games (broadcast generally at midnight of the day the match was played), live reserve and academy games and "classic" matches plus footballing news and other themed programming. The station also broadcasts live for all of the team's pre-season friendly matches (including International Champions Cup).

When it was formed, the channel existed as a three-way joint venture between Manchester United, ITV plc and BSkyB. On 16 November 2007, ITV plc sold its 33.3% stake in MUTV to Manchester United. BSkyB followed suit on 22 January 2013, making MUTV 100% owned by Manchester United.

MUTV launched in high definition (HD) in July 2014 on the Sky platform in the United Kingdom and Ireland.

Presenters and pundits

Arthur Albiston
Viv Anderson
Ron Atkinson
Wes Brown
Andy Cole
Siobhan Chamberlain
Pat Crerand
Bojan Djordjic
Ali Douglas
Stewart Gardner
Mandy Henry
Denis Irwin
Lou Macari
Helen Evans
Sammy McIlroy
Pien Meulensteen
Gary Pallister
Andy Ritchie
Sarah Stone
David Stowell
Mark Sullivan
Mickey Thomas
 Jim Rosenthal
 Niall McCaughan
 Andy Goldstein

Former presenters
Ally Begg
Hayley McQueen
Steve Bottomley
Paul Anthony
Joe Evans
Mark Pearson
Steve Bower
Matt Cole
Andrew Dickman
Dan O'Hagan
Stuart Pearson
Bryan Swanson

Guests (ex-pros)
Nicky Butt
Denis Law
David May

References

External links
Official site
Manchester United TV – UK Listings and Schedules

Manchester United F.C. media
Football club television channels in the United Kingdom
Television channels in the United Kingdom
1998 establishments in the United Kingdom
Television channels and stations established in 1998
Premier League on television